Greek Music Television or GMtv is a 24-hour lifestyle channel that broadcasts exclusively for Greek viewers in North America. It launched in October 2007 exclusively on DirecTV under the direction of Petros Hatjopoulos. GMtv is aimed at the Greek youth of America with a diverse programming mix ranging from music video clips, movie news, fashion tips and pop culture reports. Music content includes exclusive interviews with Greece's top artists, concerts, behind the scenes footage and other special programming. On March 31, 2011, GMtv was removed from DirecTV along with all other Greek services. GMtv became available on the Home2US platform in May 2011.

Programs
 GMTV News
 GMTV Top 10
 Glitter Talk- flagship lifestyle program, produced in NYC; airs weekly
 It's Your Call - All request show where viewers make submissions via Twitter

See also
 Blue

Music video networks in the United States
Television channels and stations established in 2007